Attorney General Landry may refer to:

Jeff Landry (born 1970), Attorney General of Louisiana
Ross Landry, Attorney General of Nova Scotia